Neuer Weg (German: New Path) was the official media outlet of the East German ruling party, Socialist Unity Party (SED). Its subtitle was organ des Zentralkomitees der SED fur Fragen des Parteilebens (German: Organ of the Central Committee of the SED for questions of party life). The magazine was in circulation between 1946 and 1989.

History and profile
Neuer Weg was started in 1946. Its publisher was Dietz Verlag based in East Berlin. The magazine was first published monthly. Then its frequency was switched to weekly, but from 1953 it came out biweekly. It featured theoretical articles written by the leading members of the SED, including Werner Lamberz. The editorial board members of the magazine and also, of Einheit, another official journal, were closely oversaw by the wife of Walter Ulbricht, Lotte Kühn, during the former's term as first secretary of the SED. Neuer Weg folded in 1989.

References

External links

1946 establishments in Germany
1989 disestablishments in Germany
Biweekly magazines published in Germany
Defunct political magazines published in Germany
Mass media in East Germany
Former state media
German-language magazines
Magazines established in 1946
Magazines disestablished in 1989
Magazines published in Berlin
Monthly magazines published in Germany
Socialist magazines
Socialist Unity Party of Germany
Weekly magazines published in Germany